The British National Hill Climb Championship is a hill climbing competition held annually by Cycling Time Trials with the location varying year on year. The first edition was in 1944 and it has been won by some of the best all-round British cyclists, such as Brian Robinson, Paul Curran, Malcolm Elliot, Chris Boardman and Jeff Williams.

Historically, competitors often chose to use a fixed gear bicycle for lower weight and the ability to maintain pedalling momentum.  Due to advances in gearing technology, geared bikes have dominated the field over the past decade.

2019 Championship 
The 2019 British National Hill Climb Championships was held on Haytor Vale in Devon on 27 October 2019. The winners took record-breaking victories: Hayley Simmonds' time was 00:14:17.8 and Ed Laverack's time was 00:11:37.0.

2021 Championship 
The 2021 British National Hill Climb Championships was held on Winnats Pass in Derbyshire on 31 October 2021. Tom Bell triumphantly reigned victorious in a time of 00:03:01.6 and Bithja Jones stormed up the pass to claim victory over the women's field in a time of 00:04:00.4. Tomos Pattinson blazed up the wet tarmac to take the junior men's title in a time of 00:03:26.6, whilst Sannah Zaman's effort grants her the junior women's title in a time of 00:04:44.1.

Men's results

Women's Results 
Results for the women's national hill climb only go back as far as 1998, as this is the year they competed in their own category. Prior to 1998 women and men competed in the same category.

External links
Results and links(1944-2014) 
Results Women
Results 1944-2005

References

National road cycling championships
Cycle racing in the United Kingdom
National championships in the United Kingdom